David Stephen Mitchell (born 12 January 1969) is an English novelist, television writer, and screenwriter.

He has written nine novels, two of which, number9dream (2001) and Cloud Atlas (2004), were shortlisted for the Booker Prize. He has also written articles for several newspapers, most notably for The Guardian, and translated books about autism from Japanese to English.

Early life
Mitchell was born in Southport in Lancashire (now Merseyside), England, and raised in Malvern, Worcestershire. He was educated at Hanley Castle High School and at the University of Kent, where he obtained a degree in English and American Literature followed by an M.A. in Comparative Literature.

Mitchell lived in Sicily for a year, then moved to Hiroshima, Japan, where he taught English to technical students for eight years, before returning to England, where he could live on his earnings as a writer and support his pregnant wife.

Work
Mitchell's first novel, Ghostwritten (1999), takes place in locations ranging from Okinawa in Japan to Mongolia to pre-Millennial New York City, as nine narrators tell stories that interlock and intersect. It won the John Llewellyn Rhys Prize (for best work of British literature written by an author under 35) and was shortlisted for the Guardian First Book Award. His two subsequent novels, number9dream (2001) and Cloud Atlas (2004), were both shortlisted for the Man Booker Prize. In 2003, he was selected as one of Granta's Best of Young British Novelists. In 2007, Mitchell was listed among Time magazine's 100 Most Influential People in The World.

In 2012, his metafictional novel Cloud Atlas (again, with multiple narrators), was made into a feature film. 
One segment of number9dream was made into a BAFTA-nominated short film in 2013 starring Martin Freeman, titled The Voorman Problem. In recent years he has also written opera libretti. Wake, based on the 2000 Enschede fireworks disaster and with music by Klaas de Vries, was performed by the Dutch Nationale Reisopera in 2010. He has also finished another opera, Sunken Garden, with the Dutch composer Michel van der Aa, which premiered in 2013 by the English National Opera.

Several of Mitchell's book covers were created by design duo Kai and Sunny. Mitchell has also collaborated with the duo, by contributing two short stories to their art exhibits in 2011 and 2014.

Mitchell's sixth novel, The Bone Clocks, was published on 2 September 2014. In an interview in The Spectator, Mitchell said that the novel has "dollops of the fantastic in it", and is about "stuff between life and death". The Bone Clocks was longlisted for the 2014 Man Booker Prize.

Mitchell was the second author to contribute to the Future Library project and delivered his book From Me Flows What You Call Time on 28 May 2016.

Utopia Avenue, Mitchell's ninth novel, was published by Hodder & Stoughton on 14 July 2020. Utopia Avenue tells the “unexpurgated story” of a British band of the same name, who emerged from London's psychedelic scene in 1967 and was “fronted by folk singer Elf Holloway, guitar demigod Jasper de Zoet and blues bassist Dean Moss”, said publisher Sceptre.

Other works
Following the release of the 2012 film adaptation of Cloud Atlas, Mitchell commenced work as a screenwriter alongside Lana Wachowski (one of Cloud Atlas three directors). 
In 2015, Mitchell contributed plotting and scripted scenes for the second season of the Netflix series Sense8 by the Wachowskis, who had adapted the novel for the screen, and together with Aleksandar Hemon they wrote the series finale. Mitchell had signed a contract to write season three of the series before Netflix's cancellation of the show.

In August 2019, it was announced that Mitchell would continue his collaboration with Lana Wachowski and Hemon to write the screenplay for The Matrix Resurrections with them.

Personal life
After another stint in Japan, Mitchell and his wife, Keiko Yoshida, live in Ardfield, County Cork, Ireland, . They have two children. In an essay for Random House, Mitchell wrote: I knew I wanted to be a writer since I was a kid, but until I came to Japan to live in 1994 I was too easily distracted to do much about it. I would probably have become a writer wherever I lived, but would I have become the same writer if I'd spent the last six years in London, or Cape Town, or Moose Jaw, on an oil rig or in the circus? This is my answer to myself.

Mitchell has a stammer and considers the film The King's Speech (2010) to be one of the most accurate portrayals of what it is like to be a stammerer: "I'd probably still be avoiding the subject today had I not outed myself by writing a semi-autobiographical novel, Black Swan Green, narrated by a stammering 13-year-old." Mitchell is also a patron of the British Stammering Association.

Mitchell's son is autistic. In 2013 he and his wife Yoshida translated a book attributed to Naoki Higashida, a 13-year-old Japanese autistic boy, titled The Reason I Jump: One Boy's Voice from the Silence of Autism. Higashida allegedly learned to communicate using the discredited techniques of facilitated communication and rapid prompting method.} In 2017, Mitchell and his wife translated the follow-up book also attributed to Higashida, Fall Down 7 Times Get Up 8: A Young Man's Voice from the Silence of Autism.

List of works
Novels
Ghostwritten (1999)
number9dream (2001)
Cloud Atlas (2004)
Black Swan Green (2006)
The Thousand Autumns of Jacob de Zoet (2010)
The Bone Clocks (2014)
Slade House (2015)
Utopia Avenue (2020)

Novellas
From Me Flows What You Call Time (2016; publishing delayed until )

Short stories
"The January Man", Granta 81: Best of Young British Novelists, Spring 2003
"What You Do Not Know You Want", McSweeney's Enchanted Chamber of Astonishing Stories, Vintage Books (Random House), 2004
"Acknowledgments", Prospect, 2005
"Preface", The Daily Telegraph, April 2006
"Dénouement", The Guardian, May 2007
"Judith Castle", The New York Times, January 2008
"An Inside Job", Included in "Fighting Words", edited by Roddy Doyle, published by Stoney Road Press, 2009 (Limited to 150 copies)
"The Massive Rat", The Guardian, August 2009
"Character Development", The Guardian, September 2009
"Muggins Here", The Guardian, August 2010
"Earth calling Taylor", Financial Times, December 2010
"The Siphoners", Included in "I'm With the Bears: Short Stories from a Damaged Planet", 2011
"The Gardener", in the exhibit "The Flower Show" by Kai and Sunny, 2011 (Limited to 50 copies)
"Lots of Bits of Star", in the exhibit "Caught by the Nest" by Kai and Sunny, 2013 (Limited to 50 copies)
"Variations on a Theme by Mister Donut", Granta 127: Japan, Spring 2014
"The Right Sort", Twitter, 2014
"A Forgettable Story", Cathay Pacific Discovery, July 2017 [archived]
"If Wishes Was Horses", The New York Times Magazine, July 2020
"By Misadventure", The European Review of Books, 11 June 2021

Libretto for opera
"Wake" opera in four acts (May 2010) by Klaas de Vries (composer), electronics by René Uijlenhoet for Nationale Reisopera 
"Sunken Garden"(12 April 2013), film opera for English National Opera at Barbican Theatre

Selected articles
"Japan and my writing", Essay
"Enter the Maze", The Guardian, 2004
"Kill me or the cat gets it", The Guardian, 2005 (Book review of Kafka on the Shore)
"Let me speak", British Stammering Association, 2006
"On historical fiction", The Daily Telegraph, 2010
"Adventures in Opera", The Guardian, 2010
"Imaginary City", Geist, 2010
"Lost for words", Prospect, 2011
"Learning to live with my son's autism", The Guardian, 2013
"David Mitchell on Earthsea – a rival to Tolkien and George RR Martin", The Guardian, 23 October 2015
"Kate Bush and me: David Mitchell on being a lifelong fan of the pop poet". The Guardian, 7 December 2018

Other
"The Earthgod and the Fox", 2012 (translation of a short story by Kenji Miyazawa; translation printed in McSweeney's Issue 42, 2012)
The Reason I Jump: One Boy's Voice from the Silence of Autism, 2013 (translation of Naoki Higashida's work)
"Before the Dawn", 2014 (with Kate Bush co-wrote two spoken scenes during The Ninth Wave sequence in this live production).
Fall Down 7 Times Get Up 8, 2017 (translation of Naoki Higashida's work)
"Amor Vincit Omnia", 2018; Sense8 episode
The Matrix Resurrections, 2021 (feature film screenplay co-written with Lana Wachowski and Aleksandar Hemon)

References

Sources
"The world begins its turn with you, or how David Mitchell's novels think". In B. Schoene. The Cosmopolitan Novel. Edinburgh: Edinburgh University Press, 2009.
Dillon, S. (ed.). David Mitchell: Critical Essays. Kent: Gylphi, 2011.

External links

Official website
David Mitchell's profile at the official Booker Prize site

David Mitchell - How I Write, Untitled Books, May 2010
"Get Writing: Playing With Structure" by David Mitchell at BBC.co
"Character Development" by David Mitchell, a short story from The Guardian (2009)
"David Mitchell, the Experimentalist", New York Times Magazine, June 2010
"The Floating Library: What can't the novelist David Mitchell do?", The New Yorker, 5 July 2010
"The Art of Scriptwriting: David Mitchell on Matrix 4" , at the 21. international literaturefestival berlin, 10 September 2021

1969 births
20th-century English novelists
20th-century translators
21st-century British novelists
21st-century translators
Alumni of the University of Kent
Autism activists
Clonakilty
English expatriates in Ireland
English expatriates in Italy
English expatriates in Japan
Japanese–English translators
John Llewellyn Rhys Prize winners
Living people
People educated at Hanley Castle High School
People from Southport
Postmodern writers
Teachers of English as a second or foreign language
World Fantasy Award-winning writers
Writers from Worcestershire
English male novelists
People with speech impediment